The Iéna was a brig of war of the French Navy.

She took part in the Battle of Pirano, and escaped after the explosion of Mercure.

Sources and references

Citations

References

 

Age of Sail corvettes of France
1810 ships
Ships built in France